Priti may refer to:

 Priti (goddess), a Hindu deity
 Priti (name), a given name
 Priti, Nepal, a village in Nepal

See also 
 Preti
 Pretty (disambiguation)